Allen Ratnayake was an early Sri Lankan singer and musician. Ratnayake sang for various Record labels like HMV and Columbia and scholars and  musicians like Gunapala Perera used to mention his name among the other famous artists in the gramophone era of Ceylon. 
Ratnayake had given his voice for many Sinhala gramophone records. "Jethawanarame Athi Ramani" is one of his musical albums which consisted of Nine soundtracks. "Anoma Gan Theere", "Jethawanarame athi Ramani" are two famous songs of Allen ratnayake.

Sound Tracks
 Anoma Gan Theere
 Bhagya Shree Sundara 
 Bhawa Andhakara Bindahera 
 Jethawanarame Athi Ramani 
 Lo Natha Gauthama 
 Mahamaya Muni Matha 
 Matha Pitha Denna 
 Poda Ramya Sri 
 Pura Pura Shree

References

Date of birth missing
Place of birth missing
Sinhalese musicians
Sinhalese singers